The Miracle Mile Shot is an experimental short subject, non-dialogue documentary film based entirely on a single photograph of the influential Gangsta rap group N.W.A. created on November 11, 1988 in the Miracle Mile area of Los Angeles, California by photographer/artist Ithaka Darin Pappas. The photograph itself, also entitled The Miracle Mile Shot was captured during a photo-session that took place at the photographer's home studio apartment at 6516 1/2 Orange Street, Los Angeles. The short film, screened for the first time at the LAGFF on June 19, 2019, visually tells the story (with the aid of music and printed text) of the most important uses of the photograph in chronological order.

History of the Photograph
As depicted in The Miracle Mile Shot, the photograph began its existence being used as the official press image for NWA's 1988 album, Straight Outta Compton (distributed by Priority Records), a record that would eventually go Triple Platinum. At the time of Straight Outta Compton's release, The Miracle Mile Shot was published numerous times. In May 1989, The Miracle Mile Shot appeared simultaneously on covers of the magazines, Rap Master and The Source.

Rising Presence
As time went on and N.W.A.'s global influence and relevance continued to rise, the image was used numerously in historical content. In 2008, VH1 featured the picture in their documentary entitled, "The World's Most Dangerous Group" directed by Mark Ford. The Miracle Mile Shot was also used in the cd booklet of the special edition remastered Straight Outta Compton re-release in 2002, as well as on the dvd cover of the documentary called "N.W.A. & Eazy-E: Kings Of Compton" directed by Mike Corbera and Andre Relis. According to The Miracle Mile Shot'''s written titles and imagery, in 2014, the photograph was used in the casting process of the feature, Straight Outta Compton to match present day actors with the appearance N.W.A. members DJ Yella, Dr. Dre, Eazy-E, Ice Cube and Mc ren in their early 20s. These roles would eventually be filled by O'Shea Jackson Jr., Corey Hawkins, Jason Mitchell, Aldis Hodge and Neil Brown Jr.

Snoop Dogg at the Premiere of Straight Outta Compton
On August 10, 2015, rapper Snoop Dogg attended the Los Angeles premiere of the N.W.A. biopic feature film entitled Straight Outta Compton, directed by F. Gary Gray wearing a self-produced, one of a kind long-sleeve t-shirt with The Miracle Mile photograph printed on the front of it. Los Angeles Magazine said of his attire, "Snoop Dogg broke out his N.W.A. t-shirt for last night’s world premiere of Straight Outta Compton at the Microsoft Theater L.A."

Later in 2015 and 2016, after Straight Outta Compton became a #1 film in U.S. theaters and also the announcement of N.W.A.'s impending induction into the Rock and Roll Hall of Fame, the international presence of The Miracle Mile Shot picture grew substantially. It was published in several more major U.S. newspapers, websites and magazines including Los Angeles Times, Los Angeles (magazine), Houston Chronicle, Chicago Tribune, Detroit Free Press, HipHopDX and Rolling Stone as well as Rimas E Batidas and Blitz magazine in Portugal.

The Miracle Mile Shot and the Rock n Roll Hall of Fame
On February 22 of 2016, Ice Cube posted The Miracle Mile Shot on his official Instagram page with the caption, "Kendrick Lamar will induct N.W.A at the Rock n Roll hall of Fame Induction Ceremony airing 4/30 on HBO. The picture was also published as a double-page spread in the official printed program book of the event. On March 29th 2019, at the ceremony itself, Kendrick Lamar presented the award to N.W.A. in front of a fifteen-meter high projection of the Miracle Mile Shot that remained as the main backdrop of the entire N.W.A. segment of the presentation.

The Defiant Ones
In the 2017, The Miracle Mile Shot and other images from the same photo session were featured in the four-part television documentary called The Defiant Ones about Doctor Dre and business partner Jimmy Iovine. The project was produced by Silverback Productions and directed by Allen Hughes for HBO

Museum Of Contemporary Art in Marseille, France
In early 2018, an original print of The Miracle Mile Shot traveled to Musée d'Art Contemporain in Marseille, France as part of the exhibit "Hip-Hop : Un Age d'Or" organized by French rapper, producer, curator Siba Giba.

The Making of The Miracle Mile Shot photograph
The Miracle Mile Shot was photographed on Hasselblad 500 CE camera with an 80mm lens and Norman and Chimera lighting equipment. During the same session promotional images of the young female rapper, Big Lady K were made, and images of Eazy E for the cover of his single, Eazy-Duz-It were also created.

In an interview article published by The Hundreds on September 30, 2015 written by Manos Nomikos entitled, Meet the Greek-American Artist Who Shot N.W.A's Earliest Promo Photos, photographer Ithaka Darin Pappas speaks of the session, "That first Miracle Mile shoot of N.W.A was fun as hell. It was a low-budget thing, all the sessions were, so we shot at my apartment. I lived near Fairfax and Wilshire at the time in a quiet, mostly old folks neighborhood known as Miracle Mile. And the boyz rolled up in Eazy’s GMC Safari van with chrome wheels, music blasting to distortion, and the neighbors were just horrified, especially my downstairs landlord. But forget him anyway for raising my rent that month! Dj Speed was also there and Big Lady K. We had Nacho Cheese Doritos for lunch and some O.E. Good times.

In another interview given to Daniel Cutler entitled Blazedmade Interview: Ithaka Darin Pappas (Part 1/2) on October 30, 2018, Ithaka spoke again of the Miracle Mile photo session, "That photo is known as The Miracle Mile Short. It was my first time photographing N.W.A and my first time shooting for Priority Records. It was intended to be the shoot for the cover of Eazy-E’s single “We Want Eazy". We were also trying to get publicity photos of N.W.A, as a group, which I didn’t get a whole lot of that day. We were also doing some publicity photos for Big Lady and she came by the shoot as well. I was already a big N.W.A fan. Gangsta Gangsta was blowing up KDAY which was the main radio station at the time. I mean, I was really listening to this stuff a lot. Then suddenly these guys (N.W.A) were in my living room a couple weeks later. It was pretty cool."

Soundtrack songs
"Peace Palace Porridge", "Escape From The City Of Angels", "Radiografia", "Roula's Revenge"

References

External links
U.S. Federal Copyright

2019 films
American short documentary films
2019 short documentary films
Documentary films about hip hop music and musicians
Ithaka Darin Pappas
2010s American films